Spornoye was a rural locality (a settlement) in the Yagodninsky District of Magadan Oblast, Russia. Population:  It was abolished on 8 May 2015.

Etymology

References

Former populated places in Magadan Oblast
2015 disestablishments in Russia